The 2018–19 Nicholls Colonels men's basketball team represent Nicholls State University during the 2018–19 NCAA Division I men's basketball season. The Colonels, led by first-year head coach Austin Claunch, play their home games at Stopher Gym in Thibodaux, Louisiana as members of the Southland Conference.

Previous season
The Colonels finished the 2017–18 season 21–11, 15–3 in Southland play to earn a share of the regular season championship. As the No. 2 seed in the Southland tournament, they lost in the semifinals to Stephen F. Austin.

On March 15, 2018, head coach Richie Riley left Nicholls to take the head coaching job at South Alabama. Two weeks later, the school promoted assistant coach Austin Claunch to head coach.

Roster
Sources:

Schedule and results
Sources:

|-
!colspan=9 style=| Non-conference regular season

|-
!colspan=9 style=| Southland regular season

See also
2018–19 Nicholls State Colonels women's basketball team

References

Nicholls Colonels men's basketball seasons
Nicholls State
Nicholls State Colonels men's basketball
Nicholls State Colonels men's basketball